The 1st Submarine Flotilla is a unit of the Swedish Fleet which has operated in various forms since 1904. Its unit staff is located at Karlskrona naval base, Blekinge in Karlskrona Garrison.

History
The embryo of the 1st Submarine Flotilla was formed in 1904, when the Swedish Navy was supplied with its first submarine, Hajen, and the submarine force was formed. In 1918 the submarine force was included as the 1st Submarine Division (1. undervattensbåtsdivisionen) in the Coastal Fleet. In 1934, the submarine force had been organized as the Submarine Department (Ubåtsavdelningen) with three included divisions. In 1951, the unit was assigned its current name, and was part of the Coastal Fleet as the 1st Submarine Flotilla. During the 1970s, the Navy Diving School (Flottans dykarskola) was added to the flotilla, which later formed the Diving Division (Dykdivisionen), which included submarine rescue ships.

On 1 July 1994, the flotilla was organized as the First Submarine Department (Första ubåtsavdelningen, 1. UbA). This because all units within the Swedish Armed Forces were cadre organized, and got a permanent organisation. On 1 January 1998, the flotilla received its current name 1st Submarine Flotilla, and by the Defence Act of 2004 it was decided that the flotilla with its staff would be relocated from Hårsfjärden to Karlskrona. From 1 January 2005, the flotilla came to serve from Karlskrona naval base.

Organisation
Between the years 1904-1998, the submarine force was included in the Coastal Fleet. See below the composite of the submarine force at different time points. During the 1930s, the submarine force was included in the Winter Squadron (Vintereskadern), which was the equipped part of the Swedish Navy during winter time. Parts of the submarine force were included in the Gothenburg Squadron and the Karlskrona Department (Karlskronaavdelningen) during World War II.

{| class="wikitable sortable"
! Year !! Name !! Division !! Ships
|-
| 1918 || 1. undervattensbåtsdivisionen ||   || Delfinen, Skäggald, Svärdfisken, Tumlaren
|-
| 1934 || Ubåtsavdelningen || Depådivision || Svea
|-
| 1934 || Ubåtsavdelningen || 1. ubåtsdivisionen || Draken, 'Gripen, Ulven|-
| 1934 || Ubåtsavdelningen || 2. ubåtsdivisionen || Bävern, Illern, Uttern|-
| 1934 || Ubåtsavdelningen || 3. ubåtsdivisionen || Hajen, Sälen|-
| 1940 || Ubåtsavdelningen || Depådivision || Svea|-
| 1940 || Ubåtsavdelningen || 1. ubåtsdivisionen ||  Draken, Gripen, Ulven|-
| 1940 || Ubåtsavdelningen || 2. ubåtsdivisionen || Sjöbjörnen, Sjöhunden, 
|-
| 1940 || Ubåtsavdelningen || 3. ubåtsdivisionen || Delfinen, Najad, Springaren|-
| 1945 || Ubåtsavdelningen || || SS Patricia, Belos|-
| 1945 || Ubåtsavdelningen || 1. ubåtsdivisionen || Sjöborren, Sjöhästen, Sjöormen|-
| 1945 || Ubåtsavdelningen || 7. ubåtsdivisionen || Najad, Neptun, Näcken|-
| 1945 || Ubåtsavdelningen || 12. ubåtsdivisionen || U4, U5, U6|-
| 1951 || 1. ubåtsflottiljen || || SS Patricia, Belos|-
| 1951 || 1. ubåtsflottiljen || 1. ubåtsdivisionen || Neptun, Sjöborren, Sjöhunden|-
| 1951 || 1. ubåtsflottiljen || 2. ubåtsdivisionen || Dykaren, Nordkaparen, Näcken, Sjöormen, Tumlaren|-
| 1975 || 1. ubåtsflottiljen || || Belos, 
|-
| 1975 || 1. ubåtsflottiljen || 1. ubåtsdivisionen || Sjöhästen, Vargen|-
| 1975 || 1. ubåtsflottiljen || 3. ubåtsdivisionen || Delfinen, Draken, Gripen, Hajen, 
|-
| 1989 || 1. ubåtsflottiljen || 1. ubåtsdivisionen || Sjöbjörnen, Sjöhästen, Sjölejonet, Hälsingland, Södermanland, Västergötland, Östergötland|-
| 1989 || 1. ubåtsflottiljen || 2. ubåtsdivisionen || Najad, Sjöhunden|-
| 1989 || 1. ubåtsflottiljen || Dykdivisionen || Belos|-
| 1998 || 1. ubåtsflottiljen || 2. ubåtsdivisionen || Najad, 
|-
| 1998 || 1. ubåtsflottiljen || Dykdivisionen || , URF
|-
| 1998 || 1. ubåtsflottiljen || Torpedbärgningsdivisionen || Pelikanen, Pingvinen|-
| 2021 || 1.ubåtsflottiljen ||  || Gotland, Halland, Uppland, Södermanland|}

Heraldry and traditions

Coat of arms

The coat of arms of the 1st Submarine Division (Första ubåtsavdelningen'') 1994–1998 and the 1st Submarine Flotilla since 1998. Blazon: "Or, from a wavy base azure a trident issuant sable".

Flag
The flag is a double swallow-tailed Swedish flag. It was presented to the then 1st Submarine Division by the Supreme Commander, General Owe Wiktorin at the Artillery Yard in Stockholm on 30 April 1996.

Commanding officers

1951–1951: Commander 2nd Class Åke Lindemalm
1951–1952: Commander 2nd Class Gustav Lindgren
1952–1964: ?
1964–1965: Commander Rolf Rheborg
1966–1969: Captain Hans Petrelius
1969–1971: Captain Rolf Skedelius
1971–1972: Captain Bengt Rasin
1973–1976: Captain Jan Enquist
1976–1978: Captain Bror Stefenson
1978–1981: Captain Bertil Daggfeldt
1981–1983: Captain Roderick Klintebo
1983–1987: Captain Sten Swedlund
1987–1994: ?
1994–1997: Captain Bertil Björkman
1997–2000: Captain Curt Lundgren
2000–2003: Captain Bo Rask
2004–2006: Captain Anders Järn
2006–2007: Captain Gunnar Wieslander
2007–2010: Captain Jonas Haggren
2010–2013: Captain Fredrik Norrby
2013–2016: Captain Jens Nykvist
2016–2016: Lieutenant Commander Stefan Östrand (acting)
2016–2020: Captain Mats Agnéus
2020–present: Captain Fredrik Lindén

Names, designations and locations

Footnotes

References

Notes

Print

Web

External links

 

Naval units and formations of Sweden
Military units and formations established in 1904
1904 establishments in Sweden
Haninge Garrison
Karlskrona Garrison